KGHM may refer to:

 KGHM Polska Miedź, a mining & metallurgy company in Poland.
 KGHM (AM), a radio station (1340 AM) licensed to Midwest City, Oklahoma City, United States.